Sofus Anton Birger Arctander (22 January 1845 - 20 August 1924) was a  politician with the Liberal Party who served as acting Prime Minister of Norway during 1905.

Background
Sofus Arctander was born in Christiania (now Oslo), Norway. He was the son of Hans Steenbuch Arctander (1801-1885) and Martha Dahll Nielsen (1804-1896). When he was eight years old, his family moved to Kristiansand in Vest-Agder. He was a teacher and librarian in Selje and Nordfjordeid. He received a law degree from the University of Christiania in 1870, then studied economy and philosophy at the University of Lund  in 1871.

Arctander lived at Hadsel in Nordland (1872-1884). He was deputy judge and then acting district stipendiary magistrate before establishing himself as a lawyer in 1875. In 1880 he became bailiff in Hadsel.

Political career
In 1877, Arctander was elected deputy Member of the Parliament of Norway for the County of Nordland. From 1880 to 1884 he was a permanent member. He participated actively in the founding of the Liberal Party in 1882. Arctander was re-elected to Parliament for the period 1889-1891 and 1900-1906. He subsequently become mayor of Kristiania 1908-1920.

He was Minister of the Interior 1884–1885, Norwegian state secretary in Stockholm 1885–1886, Minister of the Interior 1886-1888, Norwegian Minister of Trade 1905–1907, acting Prime Minister 1905 and Minister of Trade 1907–1908 and 1910.

Personal life
In 1887, he was promoted to Commander with Star (Commander 1st Class) of the Order of St. Olav.  Arctander also was appointed a Grand Cross of the Order of Dannebrog (Denmark) and a Commander Grand Cross of the Order of the Polar Star (Sweden). He was an honorary member and co-founder of the  Nordlendingenes Forening,  an association of people who have emigrated from the counties in Northern Norway. In 1912 he was awarded the Petter Dass Medal (Petter Dass-medaljen). Arctander died in the Lifjell Mountains of Telemark one day in August 1924,  the exact date uncertain. He had been missing for some days when he was found dead.

He was married in 1881 with Maren Sophie Aars (1849-1940), daughter of Jens Ludvig Aars (1808-1855) and Annette Lund (1818-1855). 
They were the parents of Signy Arctander.

References

Other sources

1845 births
1924 deaths
University of Oslo alumni
Government ministers of Norway
Politicians from Kristiansand
People from Vest-Agder
Commanders Grand Cross of the Order of the Polar Star
Grand Crosses of the Order of the Dannebrog
Recipients of the St. Olav's Medal
Ministers of Trade and Shipping of Norway